Owen Brennan may refer to:

 Owen Brennan (footballer) (1877–1961), Australian rules footballer
 Owen Brennan (restaurateur) (1910–1955), American restaurateur